Phantom of Inferno (known in Japan as Phantom -PHANTOM OF INFERNO-) is an adult visual novel game created by Nitroplus, directed and written by Gen Urobuchi, distributed in North America by Hirameki International (a subsidiary of the Japanese visual novel publisher Hirameki). It came out for PC in Japan in 2000 and was ported for DVD in 2001 and for PS2 in 2003. It was distributed in America as an AnimePlay DVD title in 2002. The story can take either a dark action/drama path or can turn into a romantic drama depending on the choice of the player. A remake for the Xbox 360 console was released in 2012 and ported on PC in 2013.

Plot
Phantom is an interactive (choose your own adventure) video game and its adaptations: a three-part OVA anime series, a 26-episode TV anime, and a three volume manga.

Video game
Phantom of Inferno details the life of a 15-year-old Japanese boy who is kidnapped after witnessing the killing of a reporter. The memories of his past life are erased, and he is given the choice to join 'Inferno' or die. After joining the organization he is given the name 'Zwei' (German for number 'two') and will study under 'Ein' (From the German word "Eins" for 'one'). Ein is also known as 'Phantom', the title given to the organization's top assassin.

Inferno is said to be the 'United Nations of crime syndicates'. As Zwei makes his way through training and various missions, deceit and betrayal occur even within Inferno and slowly put Zwei in increasing danger. Along the way, Zwei meets a girl by the name of Cal Devens and, though he tries to protect her, she too is drawn into Inferno to become the assassin, Drei (German for 'three').

The game is divided into three chapters. The first chapter deals with Zwei being turned into a killer and has two main "routes" to follow, the Ein route and the Claudia route. No matter which route is chosen, the chapter ends with Scythe escaping and Ein presumably dead, unless one opts to escape back to Japan. The second chapter starts off one year after the events in the first chapter, and deals with Claudia's plan to bring the Godoh group into the organization, Scythe's revenge, and the introduction of a new character, Cal Devens. It contains the Cal route and the final Claudia route.

A DVD version with added voice acting, but with removed sex scenes was released on October 26, 2001. A port to the PlayStation 2, based on the DVD version was released on May 22, 2003. Phantom Integration, an updated PC version with a new ending, but without voice acting, like the original PC release, was released on September 17, 2004. In 2010, Nitroplus announced the game will be remade for the Xbox 360 featuring the same scenario but based on the designs created for the anime series from Bee Train. Character designs from artists Minkao Shiba, Yoko Kikuchi, Tomoaki Kado, Yoshimitsu Yamashita, and Yoshiaki Tsubata were introduced into the 360 version. In addition to the design adaptations, the cast of the anime series also reprised their roles for the newer/updated version. It was originally planned for a Winter 2011 release, but was delayed due to unforeseen complications. The game was released on October 25, 2012 and ported on PC on August 30, 2013.

Phantom - The Animation
The OVA series follows Zwei as he makes a trip to America, only to witness an assassination that leads to his memory loss and indoctrination into Inferno. Though not as heavily as in the game, we see Zwei's training before he goes with Ein to help with an assassination. While a different path is taken, deceit and betrayal rip apart Inferno and place Ein and Zwei on opposite sides, which eventually leads to a climactic battle between them at the end of the anime.

Anime series

Nitroplus and Kadokawa Shoten have adapted the story into an anime series produced by Bee Train under the direction of Koichi Mashimo, titled Phantom: Requiem for the Phantom. Staff members include writer Yosuke Kuroda, who co-wrote and supervised the scripts from the staff writers Gen Urobuchi, Hideki Shirane, Noboru Kimura, Tatsuya Takahashi, and Yukihito Nonaka and designed by Bee Train artists Yoshimitsu Yamashita, Mutsumi Sasaki, Minako Shiba, Yoshiaki Tsubata, Tomoaki Kado, and Yoko Kikuchi. The series features music by Hikaru Nanase and theme songs by Kokia and Ali Project.

The series went on air on April 2, 2009 and ended its run on September 24, 2009 on TV Tokyo. Subsequently, the show also airs on AT-X, TV Aichi, and TV Osaka. The anime series is now available for internet streaming by FUNimation Entertainment. The complete series was released in English on two DVD sets January 18, 2011.

The series made its North American television debut on February 8, 2010 on the Funimation Channel.

Characters
 (Reiji Azuma 吾妻 玲二)
 The title character of the story, Zwei was a perfectly ordinary tourist from Japan, before witnessing an Inferno assassination in America and being kidnapped. He was able to elude his pursuers long enough for them to realize he had a natural survival instinct that was perfect for an assassin. He had his memory erased through a combination of drugs and hypnotherapy, and thus became the second generation Phantom. The name Zwei is simply a code name to show he is the second experimental assassin created by Scythe Master. Through Claudia, one of the three top executives of Inferno, Zwei is able to learn his true identity as Reiji Azuma. When he returns to Japan, he goes back to using this name. When his killing intent shows, in the anime, his eyes turn green with orange in the center.
Game: 
OVA: 
Anime: 

 (Elen)
 An assassin with such skill she was given the codename "Phantom", a designation given only to the best killer in Inferno. She was found by Scythe Master and was his first test subject to be given his assassin-processing treatment. She has no memories of her past and is incredibly apathetic. When she escapes to Japan, she changes her name to Elen and claims to be Reiji's twin sister Eren Azuma (吾妻 江蓮). A long and rigorous investigation by her and Reiji traces her history back to Ulan Bator, Mongolia, and though the trail ends there, Elen is able to find some peace in the area. In the OVA, she is shown to have an older brother, and it is suggested the village where she lived was massacred. Her name is erroneously spelled and sometimes pronounced as "Eren" in the anime. In the game, it is spelt and pronounced "Elen".
Game: 
OVA: 
Anime: 

 A beautiful executive of Inferno who is quick to befriend and manipulate Zwei. Though she seems to have good intentions, she is quietly manipulating Inferno and its actions. This cunning and double sided nature is never shown in the OVA.
Game: 
OVA: 
Anime: 

 Claudia's loyal childhood friend and bodyguard.
Game: 
OVA: 
Anime: 

 (Helmut von Giuseppe)
 A scientist with sadistic delusions of grandeur. He is the creator of Ein, Zwei, Drei, and the members of the Zahlenschwestern. He is referred to as Master Scythe in the OVA dub.
Game: 
OVA: 
Anime: 

 A brutal executive of Inferno, and leader of the Los Angeles gang, the "Bloodies".
OVA: 
Anime: 

 A quiet and calculating Colombian drug lord who other executives of Inferno are quick to obey. His family name is erroneously spelled "McGwire" in the OVA and the anime.
OVA: 
Anime: 

 (藤枝 美緒)
 A young girl who is unaware that her father is a boss in the yakuza. Reiji goes to her high school when he and Elen escape back to Japan. Mio soon finds herself developing feelings for him.
Game: 
Anime: 

 (Cal Devens)
 A young girl that tried to hire Zwei, thinking he was a killer for justice, by using money she had unknowingly stolen from Inferno. Zwei tries to hide her from Inferno but is unsuccessful and in a move to save her life asks that she becomes his assistant as he had been to Ein. After an attempt on his life, Zwei took her for dead and was forced to leave America to go into hiding. Cal believed that she had been left behind by Zwei and was manipulated by an exonerated Scythe, who turned her beliefs into full hatred for Zwei and trained her as his third assassin, Drei. Her clothing and situation-teenaged girl trying to hire an assassin to avenge her murdered sibling, beginning to fall in love with said assassin, and learning the art of killing herself-are very similar to those of the character Mathilda from the film Léon. In the anime she is a fan of old films. Her method of dueling, waiting until the music from the pocket-watch Reiji gave her has stopped, is a reference to For a Few Dollars More.
Game: 
Anime: 

 Six girls who all went through Scythe Master's finalized assassin creation process. They are nearly the same quality of killers as the first three, and took nowhere near as much time to train since the process to make them was based on all the original three's data. They all wear white carnival masks (similar to ones Zwei and Ein wear during one of their missions at one point) and are named: Vier, Fünf, Sechs, Sieben, Acht and Neun. "Zahlenschwestern" appropriately means "Number Sisters."

Routes
Unlike standard visual novels where you usually focus on a single girl near the start and delve more into her story, the story is much more interleaved in Phantom of Inferno. The game is divided into 3 chapters, and each chapter has different routes which will affect the sequence of events, as well as vary the scenes and endings that you will get.

Chapter 1

Ein's route
To get on Ein's route, simply think about her on the first night, and call to her on the night of the final test. After returning from the body guard assignment, save Ein, do not let her go, and console her in the motel room. At the final confrontation at the compound, Reiji will attempt to shoot Scythe, but Ein jumps into the way, taking the bullet for him. Scythe then escapes.

Claudia's route
To get on Claudia's route, the player must learn to drive the F40 and sleep with Claudia during the body guard assignment. The player must also choose to save Ein, but instead, plan to return to Inferno. During the final confrontation at the compound, Reiji will be shot at by an unknown sniper and both will play a game of cat and mouse to try and discover each other's position. Seeing someone's shadow behind him, Reiji turns and fires, hitting Ein, who had not fired even though she had gotten the drop on Reiji. Scythe then shoots Reiji and is about to finish him off when Lizzie arrives and saves his life. Scythe still manages to escape however.

Chapter 2
The events in chapter 2 will be decided by whose route the player took in chapter 1, as well as whether you partially or completely finished them. Cal's path is necessary for several of the chapter 2 endings.

Cal's route
Cal's route is very strict because a single deviation will cause the game to treat it as if the player had never met Cal in the first place. Generally speaking, all the options in Cal's route will be "Cal or something else", and the player must pick the Cal-related option (such as going shopping with her). If the player turn her down once, or simply choose to not trust her at the beginning, then the story immediately assumes that you never met her in the first place, which, depending on the player’s decisions, may seem rather odd (Choosing not to go shopping with Cal for instance, completely removes her appearance from any further scenes, almost as if she went shopping but never came back).

The exception is if the player chose not to accept Cal's confession, in which case she will still show up in the game afterwards. However the player will not be able to get the Southbound ending and will be relegated to a dead end where Ein shoots the player in the desert warehouse.

If the player completed Claudia's path in chapter 1 and start on Cal's path in chapter 2, then the player will have to pick which path they wish to complete. The player will have the option to go to Claudia's house (which will put you on Claudia's route in chapter 2) or not (Cal's route).

Ein's route
Getting to chapter three may be tricky, since it requires a specific set of circumstances. The player must have completed both Ein and Cal's paths, confirmed the sniper's identity, and discovered the identity of the attackers at the harbor. After the loft is bombed, the player must "Hide". After this the player will meet up with Ein at the warehouse and escape southwards. However, Cal is still alive and thinks that Reiji lied to her. She is then discovered by Scythe, who encourages this belief, which will form one of the crucial plot points of chapter three.

Endings
According to the official PS2 game guidebook, the endings are as follows:

Chapter 1
The Endless Nightmare: Reiji successfully escapes back to Japan and resumes his normal, everyday life with his family. One day, he catches a glimpse of Ein amidst a crowd, apparently having survived and presumably sent to terminate him. However, Reiji isn't completely sure what he saw was real or just a figment of his imagination, for he now feels as if he is living in a dream and can't get rid of his fear that he will wake up to the "real world" where he is an assassin.

Chapter 2
The End of a Long Dream: To get this ending, the player must do Claudia's path in chapter 1 and 2, but not meet Cal, and then do not shoot Lizzie when she draws her gun. Reiji then goes to the warehouse in the desert and waits for Ein to find and kill him, which she does, lamenting his death and the scar in her heart.

Southbound: To get this ending, the player must complete Ein's path in chapter 1 but not fully complete Cal's path in chapter 2, and must also identify the sniper and attackers at the harbor. Reiji goes to the warehouse in the desert and waits for Ein to kill him, but Ein asks Reiji to kill her instead, as Scythe has no more use for her and she sees no other purpose in her life. Neither is able to kill the other, and finally they vow to head south this time to start a new life together (having headed north on their failed attempt to run away from Inferno in chapter 1). This can be considered Ein's happy ending, and is more or less the same as the path to chapter 3, but since Reiji has no complete relationship with Cal, the two of them simply head south to start a new life together.

Fugitives: This ending requires the player to follow the full Cal path in chapter 2 but NOT finish Ein's path in chapter 1 or Claudia's path in chapter 2. After the loft is bombed, the player must select to "Hide". After this Cal will arrive back from her shopping trip and Reiji vows to escape with her and start a new life together.

Vengeful Spirits: This ending requires the player to follow the full Cal path in Chapter 2. After the loft is bombed, the player should select the option to "Kill everyone". Reiji goes berserk and storms Inferno HQ, killing over 20 men and McGuire in the process before dying of multiple wounds, as he believes Inferno has taken Cal away from him. However, Cal was not in the apartment during the explosion. She waits faithfully for him to return as he promised to, finally accusing him of lying to her after the third morning.

At this point, the alternative option "Hide" simply causes Reiji to go hide at the warehouse in the desert and wait for Ein to kill him, which she does not do. Instead the two flee to Japan; progressing the game from Chapter 2 to Chapter 3. It is nearly identical to "The End of the Long Dream" ending.

From Atop the Hill: There are two variations of this ending. Both require the player to finish Claudia's route in chapter 1 and 2 completely and finish off by selecting "Shoot Claudia" at the hangar. One version requires the player not to have met Cal or broken off the relationship early on, and the other requires the player to have gone as far with the Cal route as possible in addition to Claudia's route. Reiji remembers that he vowed to survive at all costs, and shoots Claudia at the hangar, bringing her body and the disk back to Inferno.

Five years later, Inferno has united all the underworld kingpins in America and is poised to conquer the new century. Then all the kingpins are shot by Scythe's elite team, the Zahlen Schwestern, as part of Reiji's plan to take over Inferno and manipulate the criminal underground for himself. He was able to do this because the Zahlen Schwestern were created based on Ein's data, and as he once tried to communicate with Ein, he managed to communicate with the Zahlen Schwestern and get them to trust in him. Reiji then shoots Scythe. If you also did the Cal route, then Lizzie reports that Cal managed to assassinate McGuire in Colombia. Reiji gives her the title of Phantom, as she became his best assassin in the 5 years since the hangar incident. If the player did not meet Cal, then she is simply not mentioned. In both variations, Lizzie is disgusted with what Reiji has become, leaving the organization for the country to start a bar. Reiji finally visits Claudia's grave at a small cemetery on top of a lonely hill, looking down at the city below.

If the player is playing the DVD version, the player will get the first part of the ending password here. The ending password unlocks several extras such as the various production trailers, TV commercials, nearly all of the FMV sequences, and the sound track. However, the English translated DVD version has the "Gun Gallery" locked out for unknown reasons. The gun gallery is used to showcase all the guns that are in the game.

The Woman in the High Castle: Unlike "From Atop the Hill", this ending has only one version regardless of whether the player met Cal or not. Reiji chooses to accept fate and allow Claudia to shoot him, and helps her by pretending to try and shoot her. Reiji ends up dying in Claudia's arms, telling her that she needs to live and get back all the things stolen from her, and to take revenge on Inferno.

One year later, Claudia has hooked up with the new No.2 man of the Gambino family, and is slowly manipulating both him and the family for her own purposes. However, she still keeps the .38 special cartridge from the bullet that she shot Reiji with, and can't seem to get rid of it or forget what she did that morning in the Hangar. As she stands at a window looking down at the city below her, she vows to become stronger or she will lose to someone like her previous, merciless self.

This ending will give the player the first part of the ending password as well.

Chapter 3
Road of the Cerulean Sky: This can be considered Ein's "True Ending". To obtain this ending, do not fully complete Mio's path in chapter 3, and at the final choice, choose to go after Elen. Reiji will find her in the church, and after a tearful reunion they get married right there and then. Reiji insists on fighting Cal, and manages to get Elen to promise him to leave and wait for him, and that he would definitely return to her. Cal arrives at the appointed time, and takes out the pocket watch that Reiji bought for her 2 years ago from a street vendor while the two of them were preparing for the counter snipe operation. Setting it on the altar, she opens it, starting the music, and sets the stage for the duel. When the music stops, both go for their guns, but Reiji is faster and Cal suffers a fatal wound. In the end, as she lies dying in Reiji's arms, Cal forgives Reiji for everything. Shortly after, the Godoh group sends 19 men to assault the church. Reiji nearly runs out of ammo, but is saved by the sudden appearance of Elen, and they manage to escape.

Scythe arrives after the sun has set with the Zahlen Schwestern and manages to get Shiga to back off and let him handle the situation. In the ensuing battle, Elen shoots Scythe, and all the members of the Zahlen Schwestern are killed. When the semester starts, Mio, who was rescued from the ruins by Shiga (who of course insisted it was a kidnapping motivated by money), can't help but feel it was a dream. Regardless, she resolves to live her life and meet the challenges of tomorrow.

Meanwhile, Elen and Reiji start a long and arduous investigation into Scythe and Elen's past, trying to discover her identity. They eventually trace her back to a Hong Kong brothel that handled young girls, and then to Ulan Bator, Mongolia, where the trail runs cold. Eventually a young translator gives them the advice to go to the grasslands and look at the sky to find Ein's homeland. With no other options, they do that, and Elen discovers that this place really is her homeland, and she ends the investigation, stating that she is satisfied just to be here with Reiji.

This ending will give the player the second part of the ending password.

Cherry Blossom Avenue: This is Mio's only ending. Elen and Cal meet at the church to duel. Cal puts her pocket watch on the altar and says that once the music stops, they shoot. Reiji appears at the last moment in order to stop the fight, but girls ignore him and fight like in the "Dusty Desert Trail" ending. When Elen throws a survival knife at Cal (which she one doesn't notice), Reiji shoots a bullet to make Cal move and not be killed and once again tries to sort out things with her, but to no avail as Cal has no intentions of making peace.

Shiga and 20 of Godoh's men arrive at the church and start shooting the three assassins. Cal kills her way out and Reiji persuades Elen to leave through the back door while he stays behind. When Reiji runs out of ammunition, Mio runs into the church and persuades him to use her as a hostage so that he could get away from the church alive. Shiga orders the men to stop shooting and Reiji and Mio safely get out and run to the school. Shiga and his men follow them, but meet Scythe Master and the Zahlen Schwestern who also want to enter the school and kill Reiji. Shiga refuses to retreat and the groups start fighting each other. Meanwhile, Reiji and Mio talk in the school about various subjects. Shiga soon finds them and says that he is the only survivor. Reiji persuades him to take Mio away while he stays behind to deal with Zahlen Schwestern. Mio at first refuses to flee, but accepts Reiji's explanation when he promises her to return to her once the fight is over.

While they are fleeing, Mio and Shiga are almost killed by one of the assassins, but Reiji kills her from the window and the two are able to run to the parking lot. Scythe notices them and orders the assassins to eliminate them. Shiga notices that the car is sabotaged and will explode if the ignition is turned on. Shiga removes the bomb from his car and orders Mio to hide behind a wall while he risks his life to check if the car is safe. At this point one of the assassins shoots Shiga and he is severely wounded, but manages to kill the assassin and drive Mio away. When they get far away enough to be safe, Shiga dies from his wounds, unable to tell Mio to not trust Reiji.

Cal watches Shiga and Mio from a distance, satisfied because her help isn't needed. Then Elen appears and points a gun at Cal saying that she considers her to be the greatest threat around. Meanwhile, Reiji manages to kill the remaining assassins, but finds himself weaponless in front of Scythe's gun. Scythe compliments Reiji and calls him his best assassin, one who unfortunately wasn't obedient enough. During their conversation, Scythe calls Ein and Drei failed experiments. At this moment, Cal sneaks up behind Scythe and kills him for insulting her. She then tells Reiji that she will let him live for now as she owes Mio but promises him to kill him and Ein in future.

Reiji then visits Mio later and they spend a night together, talking about various subjects and even sleep together. The next morning, Reiji leaves her because they are from a different world. Later on, Reiji meets with Mio's grandfather, the head of the Godoh group, and tells him to end his life of criminal activity for Mio's sake. The Godoh head refuses, so Reiji coldly threatens to kill everyone affiliated with the group before leaving the head in shock. Later, Reiji and Elen watch Mio visiting Shiga's grave from afar at the cemetery, with Elen asking Reiji if he's really sure about taking on the Godoh for the sake of one girl and Reiji answers that he will stay here a bit longer. The final scene shows cherry blossom petals fall all around Mio as she declares to look towards the future with optimism.

Dusty Desert Trails: This can be considered Cal's "True Ending". As with "Road of the Cerulean Sky", do not fully complete Mio's path and at the last choice, choose to go after Drei. In this ending, Reiji rescues Mio, and they part with no explanations as Reiji is still trying to prevent her from getting mixed up in the mess. Cal returns and finds Mio gone, and calls Reiji. Taunting her over the phone, Reiji arranges a duel at the church in one hour, with the intent to deliberately lose. As the music box stops and Cal is about to fire, Elen appears and forces Cal to dodge and miss. The two girls then have a duel which Elen is about to win, but Reiji jumps in front of Cal, blocking the knife with his back and fainting. Cal is stunned that Reiji would do something like this for her, and Elen explains that this is what he wished for.

Godoh's men attack the church, and Elen convinces Cal to take Reiji and escape from the back while she holds them off. After the sun has set, Scythe shows up at the church with the Zahlen Schwestern and marvels at the mound of corpses. Meanwhile, Cal has hidden in the school with Reiji, and Cal has reverted to her happy personality before she became Drei. She demands that Reiji have sex with her, but just as they are about to start, three members of the Zahlen Schwestern launch a surprise attack and are taken out by Cal almost instantly. Cal then goes to try and draw out the other three, but one of them sweeps the building looking for Reiji and falls into his trap. Just as Reiji is about to go help Cal, he is shot by Scythe. Cal blows up the last two Zahlen Schwestern using the chemistry lab, but is forced to drop her guns as Scythe uses Reiji as a hostage. Scythe is about to shoot Cal, but is shot by Elen who suffered fatal wounds from the battle with Godoh's men, and she dies in Cal's arms.

An unspecified amount of time later, Reiji and Cal have become well known free lance assassins known as "Phantom" and hitched a ride on a truck heading to a desert town "Santa Madelia", presumably somewhere in Mexico (as one of the gangsters there use the term "gringo"), their target being the gang boss of the town with the whole town there to protect him. They make plans to go on a holiday after this job, and think about how they will be together, always.

This ending will give the player the last part of the ending password.

There is also an additional "bad" ending exclusively for Phantom Integration that can be found in Chapter 3. In order to acquire this ending, the player must have completely fulfilled Cal's path back in chapter 2 (choose to make love to her) and then choose to search for Ein in chapter 3. This will follow the "Road of the Cerulean Sky" ending until it reaches the duel between Reiji and Cal. Here, Reiji is unable to keep his promise to Elen and hesitates in shooting Cal, allowing her to win the duel. Cal stands there and wonders why Reiji didn't shoot. A moment later, she is interrupted by Scythe arriving in the church with the Zahlen Schwestern in tow. Scythe is pleasantly surprised at the outcome of the match and compliments Cal. However, she seems dissatisfied and impulsively betrays Scythe, causing a shootout between her and the Zahlen Schwestern. Time passes until nightfall and Cal is lying down wounded on a beach, presumably winning the battle at the church. Ein arrives at the scene a moment later, seeking revenge against Cal for killing Reiji. However, Cal makes no motion to defend herself and simply lies there, appearing regretful for the events that transpired. Elen in turn loses her motivation to carry out her vengeance and looks up sorrowfully at the night sky. Nothing they do now will bring Reiji back, and so both of them can do nothing more but lament their loss.

References

External links

Official PS2 game site 
Official Xbox 360 game site 
Official anime site 

 FUNimation Official Episode Streaming Page
FUNimation Official Site
Phantom: Requiem for the Phantom at IMDb.com

2000 video games
2004 anime OVAs
2009 anime television series debuts
2009 manga
Bee Train Production
Genco
Bishōjo games
Eroge
Funimation
Japan-exclusive video games
Nitroplus
Organized crime video games
Organized crime in anime and manga
PlayStation 2 games
Films with screenplays by Gen Urobuchi
Television shows written by Yōsuke Kuroda
Seinen manga
Television shows set in California
Video games developed in Japan
Visual novels
Windows games
Xbox 360 games
PrincessSoft games
Hirameki International games